Jacques Viger (May 7, 1787 – December 12, 1858) was an antiquarian, archaeologist, and the first mayor of Montreal, Quebec, Canada.

Biography 
 
Viger was born in Montreal, the son of Jacques Viger who represented Kent in the 2nd Parliament of Lower Canada, and studied at the Sulpician college of Montreal. On November 17, 1808 he married Marie Marguerite La Corne, daughter of Luc de la Corne, and widow of Major the Hon. John Lennox. They had three children, all of whom died in infancy.

After his studies he went to Quebec, where he worked as an editor of the newspaper Le Canadien from November 1808 to May 1809. Viger served as captain in the Canadian Voltigeurs unit under Charles de Salaberry during the War of 1812. He was elected the first mayor of Montreal in 1833 and worked to improve its sanitary conditions. Although he wrote little, his reputation as an archaeologist was universal, and the greatest contemporary historians of France and the United States have drawn from his collection of manuscripts, based on forty years of research. He compiled a chronicle under the title of "Sabretache" (28 vols.), wherein he gathered plans, maps, portraits, and valuable notes illustrating many contested historical points. He was the founder of the Historical Society of Montreal in 1857, one year before his death. Pope Pius IX honoured him with the knighthood of the Order of St. Gregory the Great.

He died December 12, 1858 at age 71 and was buried in the crypt of the Notre-Dame-de-Grâce Church on December 15.

Honours 
The Viger Square and Jacques Viger Building in Montreal are named in his honour.

See also 
 
List of presidents of the Saint-Jean-Baptiste Society of Montreal
List of mayors of Montreal

References
 Robert, Jean-Claude. « Viger, Jacques », in Dictionary of Canadian Biography Online, University of Toronto and Université Laval, 2000
  Ville de Montréal. Jacques Viger — L'Album Viger : Souvenirs canadiens [online exposition]

Bibliography

External links 
 
 Biography at the Dictionary of Canadian Biography Online 
  Ancestors of Jacques Viger

1787 births
1858 deaths
19th-century Canadian civil servants
Canadian archaeologists
Mayors of Montreal
Presidents of the Saint-Jean-Baptiste Society of Montreal